Józef Czeslaw Bartosik CB DSC (20 July 1917 – 14 January 2008) was a Polish Naval officer, born in Topola Wielka near Ostrów Wielkopolski, who served in Polish destroyers during World War II, under British naval command. Shortly after World War II, he joined the British Royal Navy and advanced to the rank of rear admiral, before his retirement in 1969. He died in England in January 2008.

Wartime service in the Polish Navy
In 1935, at the age of 18, he joined the Naval officer cadet school in Toruń. He graduated in 1938 and in 1939 he was the first watch officer in the cadet schooner ORP Iskra. During the latter half of 1939, he led the wooden sailing ship on a voyage through the Mediterranean and into Southern Atlantic waters. On learning of the 1939 invasion of Poland by Nazi forces, Iskra returned from the Atlantic and left two crew members with the ship in Morocco. Along with the rest of Iskras crew, Bartosik boarded a French ship and departed for France, where after deliberations between the French Navy's War Department and free Polish forces, he reported as a member of the reserve officer group at the ship-base ORP Gdynia in Great Britain.

In 1940, he served as a watch keeping officer and deputy gunnery officer aboard the destroyer ORP Błyskawica. During this time, he was instrumental in Błyskawicas downing of two Luftwaffe aircraft during the Norwegian campaign. He was also in the first crew of the destroyer ORP Garland where he was a watch keeping officer. After promotion to first lieutenant in 1941 he took over responsibilities of the gunnery officer. In Garland he participated in action in the Mediterranean and the raid on Spitsbergen involving the evacuation of the Norwegian Royal family; as well as serving in convoys in the Arctic, Atlantic, near Iceland and the Mediterranean. In 1942 he became flag lieutenant to the chief operating officer of the navy. In 1943 he served aboard Błyskawica as the gunnery officer and participated in Operation Neptune. In 1944 he was promoted captain and returned to the department of the navy. In 1945 he became the gunnery officer of the Polish cruiser ORP Conrad. Bartosik helped to carry Red Cross supplies to Norway and Denmark before Conrad was returned to the Royal Navy in September 1946. For his actions he was awarded a Virtuti Militari, a Cross of Valour and a British DSC.

Post-war service in the Royal Navy
In 1948 he was one of only three Polish officers to be accepted into the RN out of several hundred who volunteered. It meant relinquishing his wartime rank of lieutenant-commander, and he was appointed to the battleship Anson as a lieutenant with seniority from July 1941. His draft to Anson was nearly rescinded when her captain noticed that Bartosik dared to sport his Polish Virtuti Militari ahead of his British DSC. He was dispatched to serve on escort vessels. From 1955 to 1958 he was the commander of the frigate HMS Comus. From September 1959 he led the 5th Frigate Squadron from HMS Scarborough. From 1962 to 1963 he was commander of Royal Naval Air Station RNAS Culdrose. From 1964 to 1965, he commanded the guided missile destroyer London, and from 1966 to 1968 he was Assistant Chief of Naval Staff (Operations). In 1969, he retired with the rank of rear admiral.

During his time in command of London he was involved in a notorious incident. Having sacked his second-in-command in the newly commissioned guided-missile destroyer London in late 1965, he was sent the strong character Mike Henry as a replacement. When London arrived in Singapore for maintenance work Bartosik, for unspecified reasons, had him placed under arrest in his cabin. Mike Henry endured this treatment, but the Fleet chaplain had to intervene with the Captain of the Fleet to obtain his release. Later Bartosik is alleged to have written to Rear-Admiral Horace Law, then Flag Officer Submarines, saying that he considered Henry unsuitable for an important submarine appointment "understood to be impending". Law’s reply is said to have been one of the few occasions when Bartosik’s legendary malevolence was checked.

Author
Bartosik was the author of the book Faithful Ship  published in 1947, by Orbis of London, listed by the British library, System number: 000217951, Shelf Mark: 9102.a.32.

Honours and awards
 Silver Cross of the Order of Virtuti Militari
 Cross of Valour
 Marine Medal, three times
 Companion of the Order of the Bath (military) (UK)
 Distinguished Service Cross (UK)
 1939-1945 Star (UK)
 Africa Star (UK)
 Atlantic Star (UK)
 France and Germany Star (UK)
 War Medal 1939–1945 (UK)

References

1917 births
2008 deaths
Polish military personnel of World War II
Royal Navy rear admirals
Recipients of the Distinguished Service Cross (United Kingdom)
Recipients of the Silver Cross of the Virtuti Militari
Recipients of the Cross of Valour (Poland)
Companions of the Order of the Bath
Polish emigrants to the United Kingdom
Polish Navy officers